Bad Laws: An Explosive Analysis of Britain's Petty Rules, Health and Safety Lunacies, and Madcap Laws is a book written by Philip Johnston and published by Constable in 2010. Foster thought it expert and merciless. Appleton called it "thorough and persuasive".

See also
Dumb laws
Law reform

References
Johnston, Phillip. Bad Laws: An Explosive Analysis of Britain's Petty Rules, Health and Safety Lunacies, and Madcap Laws. Constable. . 2010. Google Books.
Allfree, Claire. Bad Laws exposes the flaws that curtail individual freedom (Book review of "Bad Laws"). Metro. 6 April 2010.
Wilson, Ben. Bad Laws: An Explosive Analysis of Britain's Petty Rules, Health and Safety Lunacies and Madcap Laws by Philip Johnston: review". The Telegraph. 13 April 2010. Also serialised in "Bad laws: Labour has clowned around with our freedom" and "How do we win back our freedom".
Sutton, Henry. "Bad Laws by Philip Johnston" in The Ticket. April 2010 archives. The Mirror.
Crawley, William. "A Summer of Books" in Will & Testament. BBC. 1 August 2010.

Law books
2010 non-fiction books
Constable & Robinson books